is French for "half-world". The term derives from a play called , by Alexandre Dumas , published in 1855. The play dealt with the way that prostitution at that time threatened the institution of marriage. The  was the world occupied by elite men and the women who entertained them and whom they kept, the pleasure-loving and dangerous world Dumas immortalized in the 1848 novel  and its many adaptations. Demimondaine became a synonym for a courtesan or a prostitute who moved in these circles—or for a woman of social standing with the power to thumb her nose at convention and throw herself into the hedonistic nightlife. A woman who made that choice would soon find her social status lost, as she became . The 1958 film Gigi, based on a 1944 novella by Colette, vividly portrays the world of the demimonde near the end of its existence. Gigi's Aunt Alicia, a legendary courtesan now enjoying a wealthy retirement, trains her teenage niece in elegant manners and deportment and the value of jewels and tries to stir her interest in fashion, in order to prepare her for life in the demimonde, pleasing the gentlemen who will provide her with the means to live comfortably.

It embraced heavy drinking, drug use, gambling, attending the theatre and ballet and horse races, the pursuit of high fashion in every aspect of life—and, of course, sexual promiscuity. Lavish spending led to indebtedness; the promiscuity could, in the worst scenario, led to disease.

The twentieth century brought the rise of the New Woman, changing economies and social structures, as well as changing fashions and social mores, particularly in the aftermath of World War I. Prostitution and the keeping of mistresses did not disappear,  but the label  became obsolete as the 'half-world' changed.

Women called  
Externally, the defining aspects of the demimonde were an extravagant lifestyle of fine food and clothes, often surpassing that of other wealthy women of their day with a steady income of cash and gifts from their various lovers. Internally, their lifestyle was an eclectic mixture of sharp business acumen, social skills, and hedonism. Intelligent demimondaines, like the fictional Gigi's grandmother, would invest their wealth for the day when their beauty faded. Others ended up penniless and starving when age took its toll on their beauty, unless they managed to marry.

A famous beauty was Virginia Oldoini, Countess di Castiglione, who came to Paris in the 1850s with very little money of her own and soon became mistress of Napoleon III; after that relationship ended she moved on to other wealthy men in government, finance and European royalty. She was one of the most aristocratic and exclusive of the demimondaines—reputed to have charged a member of the British aristocracy one million francs for 12 hours in her company.

Another woman who doubtless influenced later images of the demimondaine was the dancer and adventuress Lola Montez, though she died before the term came into general use.

The actress Sarah Bernhardt was the illegitimate child of a courtesan; in her day all actresses were generally considered demimondaines. Her many lovers and extravagant lifestyle fit the type, though her genuine successes as an artist and innovator eventually gained her a kind of public esteem most demimondaines never achieved.

Fictional  
Descriptions of the  can be found in Vanity Fair (1848), a novel which satirizes nineteenth century society, written by William Makepeace Thackeray. Lady Crackenbury and Mrs. Washington White are  characters, both of whom Captain Rawdon Crawley lusts after in his younger days. Becky Sharp is perceived as a  before she is presented at court, and then becomes one when she travels through Europe after her husband abandons her.

The opera, in turn, was inspired by Alexandre Dumas 's ; Marguerite Gautier, the heroine of the book and subsequent play, was based on Marie Duplessis, 1840s Paris courtesan and mistress to a number of prominent men, including Dumas. She would famously be portrayed on stage by the aforementioned Sarah Bernhardt.

In writing his 1924 play Easy Virtue, Noël Coward stated his object was to present a comedy in the structure of a tragedy "to compare the  woman of to-day with the more flamboyant  of the 1890s."

Colette's Gigi (1944) also describes the demimonde and their lifestyle. Gigi is schooled from childhood to be a kept woman, to stifle her feelings in return for a life of ease. "We never marry in our family", says Gigi's grand-mother.

In A Little Night Music (1973, Stephen Sondheim), the main female character, Desiree Armfeldt, is an actress whose mother, Madame Leonora Armfeldt, sings a song, Liaisons, which describes the material benefits of being a serially kept woman. For example, "At the villa of the Baron De Signac, Where I spent a somewhat infamous year, At the villa of the Baron De Signac—I had ladies in attendance—Fire-opal pendants." And: "At the palace of the Duke of Ferrara, Who was prematurely deaf but a dear, At the palace of the Duke of Ferrara—I acquired some position—Plus a tiny Titian."

Other uses of the term in fiction 
In Henryk Sienkiewicz's Without Dogma (1891), the term  refers to the affluent, pleasure-seeking portion of society, unbound by morals, religion or tradition, and is loosely analogous to the "jet set" of modern times.

Françoise Sagan, in her novel  (1954), uses the term  to refer to the character Elsa, a young, stunningly attractive woman who leverages her appearance into support by wealthy men, which allows her entrance into the social world of the upper classes.

The high society men in Peter Matthew Hillsman Taylor's novella The Old Forest (from the story collection of the same name, 1985) use  to refer to a group of "adventurous" and intelligent young women in 1937 Memphis, Tennessee; in the story, it is common for the men to continue courting such "demimondames" right up until the time they are married to high society women.

The term appears repeatedly in James Joyce's Ulysses.

In Kim Stanley Robinson's Mars trilogy (1990s), the term  refers to a semi-tolerated, "off the net" society of commerce and education.

In popular culture 
It is also the title of the fourth episode of the first season.

See also
 Ukiyo

References

Sources
 William Makepeace Thackeray (1848), Vanity Fair.
 Colette (1945), Gigi.
 William Blatchford (editor) (1983), The Memoirs of Cora Pearl: The Erotic Reminiscences of a Flamboyant 19th Century Courtesan. London; New York: Granada. .
 Katie Hickman (2003), Courtesans : Money, Sex and Fame in the Nineteenth Century . New York: Morrow. .

1850s neologisms
Social groups
French words and phrases
High society (social class)
Prostitution in France
Prostitutes by type
Courtesans by type
Belle Époque